Cengio ( or) is a comune (municipality) in the Province of Savona in the Italian region Liguria, located about  west of Genoa and about  northwest of Savona.

Cengio borders the following municipalities: Cairo Montenotte, Cosseria, Millesimo, Montezemolo, Roccavignale, and Saliceto.

Demographic evolution

References

Cities and towns in Liguria